Patrick J. "Paddy" Riordan (31 August 1871 - March 1941) was an Irish hurler who played as a forward for the Tipperary senior team.

Born in Drombane, County Tipperary, Riordan  first arrived on the inter-county scene at the age of twenty-three when he first linked up with the Tipperary senior team. He made his debut during the 1894 championship. Riordan went on to play a key part for Tipperary, and won two All-Ireland medals and two Munster medals.

At club level Riordan was a three-time championship medallist. He began his club career with Drombane before later joining Upperchurch–Drombane and Thurles.

Riordan retired from inter-county hurling following the conclusion of the 1907 championship.

Honours

Team

Drombane
Tipperary Senior Hurling Championship (1): 1894

Thurles
Tipperary Senior Hurling Championship (2): 1906, 1907

Tipperary
All-Ireland Senior Hurling Championship (2): 1895, 1906
Munster Senior Hurling Championship (2): 1895, 1906

References

1871 births
1941 deaths
Upperchurch-Drombane hurlers
Thurles Sarsfields hurlers
Tipperary inter-county hurlers
All-Ireland Senior Hurling Championship winners